"I Know" is a song by American hip hop recording artist Yo Gotti. The song was released on November 15, 2013, as the fourth single from his fourth studio album, I Am (2013). "I Know" features a guest appearance from rapper Rich Homie Quan who produced the song along with Trauma Tone. The song samples Club Nouveau's "Why You Treat Me So Bad", the same song sampled on Luniz's prolific "I Got 5 On It". Following its release, the song peaked at number 31 on the US Billboard Hot R&B/Hip-Hop Songs chart.

Background and release 
On November 6, 2013, the Rich Homie Quan featuring "I Know" was released for free streaming online along with the rest of the album. The song which was produced by Trauma Tone and Rich Homie Quan, features a significant sample use of Club Nouveau's "Why You Treat Me So Bad", the same song sampled on Luniz's prolific "I Got 5 On It". This is replicated in the bass line and string layers.

On November 15, 2013, "I Know" was released for digital download as the album's fourth single. It was serviced to rhythmic contemporary radio in the United States on May 27, 2014.

Critical reception 
"I Know" received generally positive reviews from music critics. David Jeffries of AllMusic praised the song and sample usage as "great". Bryan Dupont-Gray of The Daily Cougar stated the production sold the song and it is one of the better tracks on the album. Grant Jones of RapReviews.com said, Gotti's "messy flow and rushed delivery are left all over an admittedly decent take on the inimitable Da Luniz track "I Got Five On It"." Ronald Grant of HipHopDX said, ""I Know" contains production directly inspired by Club Nouveau's old school R&B classic "Why You Treat Me So Bad," but contains a lazy hook by guest star Rich Homie Quan. This ultimately makes the tune listenable yet draggingly boring."

Music video 
The music video for "I Know" was released on May 1, 2014.

Charts

Weekly charts

Year-end charts

Certifications

Release history

References 

2013 singles
2013 songs
Yo Gotti songs
Rich Homie Quan songs
Epic Records singles
Songs written by Thomas McElroy
Songs written by Denzil Foster
Songs written by Yo Gotti